Ďurica is a Slovak surname, it may refer to:
 Ján Ďurica, Slovak footballer
 Martin Ďurica, Slovak footballer
 Milan Stanislav Ďurica, Slovak historian and theologian
 Pavol Ďurica, Slovak footballer
 Peter Ďurica, Slovak footballer
 Tomáš Ďurica, Slovak footballer

Slovak-language surnames